Ferenc Lénárt (born 23 November 1964) is a Hungarian weightlifter. He competed in the men's bantamweight event at the 1992 Summer Olympics.

References

External links
 

1964 births
Living people
Hungarian male weightlifters
Olympic weightlifters of Hungary
Weightlifters at the 1992 Summer Olympics
People from Pápa
Sportspeople from Veszprém County
20th-century Hungarian people